Løkken Verk (sometimes just called Løkken) is a village in the municipality of Orkland in Trøndelag county, Norway.

History

Løkken Verk was originally populated when the Løkken Mine started mining for copper in 1654. The name comes from a farm at the place. There was mining at Løkken from 1654 until 1987. Prior to 1845, the target was copper that was smelted, but in 1851 the mine transferred into mining pyrites that were exported, primarily as raw material for sulfuric acid. From 1931 until 1962, sulfur and copper were produced at Orkla Metal in Thamshavn. The history of the mining is preserved at Orkla Industrial Museum at Løkken Verk.

In 1904, the mining operation was taken over by Christian Thams and Orkla Grube-Aktiebolag, this group has evolved into the Forbes 500-company Orkla Group. At the same time, the Thamshavnbanen railway was built between Løkken Verk and Thamshavn (just north of Orkanger) to transport the pyrites to the port.

References

External links
Orkla Industrial Museum
Lokken Verk

Villages in Trøndelag
Orkland